The 2006 SAP Open was a men's tennis tournament held in San Jose, United States that was part of the International Series of the 2006 ATP Tour. It was the 118th edition of the tournament and was held from 13 February through 19 February 2006. Unseeded Andy Murray won the single title.

Finals

Singles

 Andy Murray defeated  Lleyton Hewitt 2–6, 6–1, 7–6(7–3)

Doubles

 Jonas Björkman /  John McEnroe defeated  Paul Goldstein /  Jim Thomas 7–6(7–2), 4–6, [10–7]

References

External links 
 2006 SAP Open tournament draws (Singles / Doubles)

 
SAP Open
SAP Open
SAP Open
SAP Open
SAP Open